Lydia Marie Clarke Heston (April 14, 1923 – September 3, 2018) was an American actress and photographer.

Biography 
Clarke attended high school in Lexington, Kentucky, and graduated from Northwestern University.

A comment by Carl Sandburg after he saw her perform with the Asheville Little Theatre led her to change her career plans from practicing law to acting.

On Broadway, Clarke portrayed Mary McLeod in Detective Story (1949). She appeared on Studio One on television. Her film debut came in The Greatest Show on Earth (1952).

Clarke took photographs "all over the world, recording everything from Afghan refugees in the Khyber Pass to the fellahin in their Nile villages." Time and Fortune were among the magazines that published her work. She also exhibited her photographs in museums and galleries and had her work published in two books.

She married actor Charlton Heston on March 17, 1944, at Grace Methodist Church in Greensboro, North Carolina, and their marriage lasted for 64 years until his death on April 5, 2008. They had two children: Fraser Clarke Heston and Holly Heston Rochell.

Clarke and Heston were co-directors and acted at the Thomas Wolfe Memorial Theatre in Asheville, North Carolina.

Clarke died from complications due to pneumonia on September 3, 2018, at UCLA Medical Center, in Santa Monica, California, at the age of 95. She was a breast cancer survivor and had undergone a mastectomy.

Filmography

Film

Television

References

External links 

 
 
 

1923 births
2018 deaths
20th-century American actresses
20th-century American photographers
Actresses from Wisconsin
American film actresses
American photographers
American stage actresses
American television actresses
American women photographers
Deaths from pneumonia in California
People from Two Rivers, Wisconsin
Photographers from Wisconsin
21st-century American women